Dave Mullett (born 27 June 1965) is a former international speedway rider from England.

Speedway career 
Mullett reached the final of the British Speedway Championship on five occasions in 1991, 1992, 1993, 1994 and 1996. He rode in the top tier of British Speedway from 1981 to 2002, riding for Canterbury Crusaders and Reading Racers. He won the British League title twice with Reading in 1990 and 1992.

References 

Living people
1965 births
British speedway riders
Canterbury Crusaders riders
Reading Racers riders